The 1965–66 Michigan State Spartans men's basketball team represented Michigan State University in the 1965–66 NCAA Division I men's basketball season as members of the Big Ten Conference. They played their home games at Jenison Fieldhouse in East Lansing, Michigan and were coached by John E. Benington in his first year as head coach of the Spartans. They finished the season 15–7, 10–4 in Big Ten play to finish in second place.

Previous season 
The Spartans finished the 1964–65 season 5–18, 1–13 in Big Ten play to finish in last place.

Following the season, head coach Forrest "Forddy" Anderson was fired after 11 years as the Spartans' head coach. Shortly thereafter, the school hired John E. Benington, head coach at Saint Louis, as head coach.

Roster and statistics 

Source

Schedule and results 
The Spartans participated in the second annual Rainbow Classic at the Honolulu International Center from December 27–30, 1966. There they played against a Marine and Army team in the tournament. These games do not count on the official record.
|-
!colspan=9 style=| Non-conference regular season

|-
!colspan=9 style=|Big Ten regular season

Source

References 

Michigan State Spartans men's basketball seasons
Michigan State
Michigan State Spartans basketball
Michigan State Spartans basketball